June Clark (born 23 June 1939)  is an Australian Paralympic lawn bowls player. She was born in Kent, England.  She won a silver medal at the 1996 Atlanta Games in the women's singles LB3-5 event.

References

Paralympic lawn bowls players of Australia
Lawn bowls players at the 1996 Summer Paralympics
Paralympic silver medalists for Australia
Living people
Medalists at the 1996 Summer Paralympics
1939 births
Australian female bowls players
Paralympic medalists in lawn bowls
20th-century Australian women